Helio Paes Pereira Junior  (born 27 February 1980, in Castanhal), known as Helinho is a Brazilian former footballer who played in several Brazilian state leagues, Peruvian Primera División, USL First Division, Canadian Soccer League, and Categoría Primera A.

Playing career
Helinho began playing at the local level with his hometown team Castanhal Esporte Clube. He had stints with Coritiba, Clube Municipal Ananindeua, Clube do Remo, and played in Peru with Unión Huaral. In 2004, Helinho went abroad to Canada to sign with the Toronto Lynx of the USL First Division. His signing was announced in a press conference where the Lynx introduced two more signings from Brazil. 
He made his debut on May 26, 2006, against Miami FC coming on as a substitute for Osni Neto. Helinho would only make one appearance and was subsequently deemed surplus. In order to make room for new additional signings, Helinho's contract was bought out by the Brampton Stallions of the Canadian Soccer League.

Helinho made his debut on June 25, 2006, against London City, where he recorded his first goal of the season in a 6–0 thrashing over City at home. Helinho would further contribute to the Stallions by scoring another goal in 6–0 victory over the Caribbean Selects. He had a relatively successful tenure with Brampton, where he led that Stallions to five game undefeated streak and finished off the season with five goals. He helped the Brampton side clinch a playoff spot by finishing second in the National Division. The following season, he signed with the Portuguese Supra where he finished as the club's leading scorer with 9 goals. In 2009, he returned to South America to sign with Millonarios Fútbol Club, and in 2010 he returned to Brazil to play with his former club Castanhal Esporte Clube.

Honours

Player
Clube do Remo
Pará State Championship: 1
 2003

References

1980 births
Living people
Brazilian footballers
Canadian Soccer League (1998–present) players
Association football midfielders
Toronto Lynx players
SC Toronto players
Brampton Stallions (Hitmen) players
USL First Division players
Clube do Remo players
Unión Huaral footballers
Coritiba Foot Ball Club players
Millonarios F.C. players
Peruvian Primera División players
Categoría Primera A players
Sportspeople from Pará
People from Castanhal